Christine Benning (née Tranter, born 30 March 1955) is an English former middle-distance runner who competed mainly in the 1500 metres and the 3000 metres. In the 1500 m, she represented Great Britain  at the 1984 Olympic Games in Los Angeles, finishing fifth in the final. She won a silver medal at the 1978 Commonwealth Games in Edmonton. She also broke the UK record in 1979, with 4:01.53. As of 2022, she still ranks in the UK all-time top ten (outdoors) for the mile.

Career
Benning was born in Urmston, Lancashire, England. In 1971, as Christine Tranter, she won the AAAs Under 17 800 metres title. In 1974, still a teenager, she was 15th at the World Cross Country Championships and won a gold medal in the team event. In 1975, she was 18th. She finished fifth in the 1500 m final at the 1977 World Student Games (Universiade) in Sofia in 4:09.7.

In 1978, Benning was 12th at the World Cross Country Championships in Glasgow. In the summer, she won the AAA Championships 3000 m title in 8:52.33. Then at the Commonwealth Games in Edmonton, she won a silver medal in the 1500 m final behind Mary Stewart, running 4:07.53. In 1979, she broke Sheila Carey's seven-year-old UK record in the 1500 metres, running 4:01.53 in Zurich. The record would stand for five years.

In the early 1980s, Benning achieved two more top twenty finishes at the World Cross Country Championships, with 14th in 1981 and 18th in 1983. At the 1983 World Championships in Helsinki, she reached the 3000 metres final, finishing thirteenth in 8:58.01.

Benning achieved her highest placement at the World Cross Country Championships in 1984, finishing sixth in New Jersey. Then in the summer, she added the AAAs 1500 m title to her previous wins at 800 m and 3000 m. At the 1984 Los Angeles Olympics, she reached the 1500 m final, finishing fifth in 4:04.70. She ended the 1984 season by running her best ever times in both the 3000 metres and the mile, with 8:44.46 in Zurich and 4:24.57 in London.

In 1986, Benning won the AAAs 3000 m title, going on to place fourth at the Commonwealth Games in Edinburgh. At the 1987 IAAF World Cross Country Championships she finished 20th, her seventh top twenty finish in the event. In the summer, she won the UK Championships 1500 m title. Then at the World Championships in Rome in September, she reached the 3000 m final for the second time, finishing 12th in 8:57.92.

Benning is the only woman to have won AAAs Senior National titles at 800 m, 1500 m and 3000 m. On the UK all-time lists, she ranks 15th in the 1500 m (4:01.53), 11th in the mile (4:24.57) (10th excluding indoor performances) and 18th in the 3000 m (8:44.46).

National titles
AAAs National Champion - 800 metres (1979)
AAAs National Champion - 1500 metres (1984)
AAAs National Champion - 3000 metres (1978, 1986)
UK National Champion - 1500 metres (1987)

International competitions

Note: At the World Cross Country Championships, representing England, Benning won three team medals, gold in 1974, bronze in 1978 and silver in 1984.

References

1955 births
Living people
Sportspeople from Manchester
English female middle-distance runners
English female cross country runners
Olympic athletes of Great Britain
Athletes (track and field) at the 1984 Summer Olympics
Commonwealth Games silver medallists for England
Commonwealth Games medallists in athletics
Athletes (track and field) at the 1978 Commonwealth Games
Athletes (track and field) at the 1986 Commonwealth Games
World Athletics Championships athletes for Great Britain
Medallists at the 1978 Commonwealth Games